Sahak II may refer to:

 Sahak II Bagratuni,  marzban of Persian Armenia in 481–482
 Sahak II of Cilicia, Catholicos of the Holy See of Cilicia in 1902–1939